The 14th constituency of the Pas-de-Calais is a French legislative constituency in the Pas-de-Calais département.

Election results

2007

Sources
 Official results of French elections from 1998: 

Defunct French legislative constituencies
French legislative constituencies of Pas-de-Calais